Kistysh is a rural locality (a selo) in Seletskoye Rural Settlement, Suzdalsky District, Vladimir Oblast, Russia. The population was 50 as of 2010. There are 6 streets.

Geography 
Kistysh is located on the Kestra River, 15 km northwest of Suzdal (the district's administrative centre) by road. Vishenki is the nearest rural locality.

References 

Rural localities in Suzdalsky District
Suzdalsky Uyezd